Campbell County Courthouse may refer to:

Campbell County Courthouse (Georgia), Fairburn, Georgia
Campbell County Courthouse (Newport, Kentucky), listed on the National Register of Historic Places
Campbell County Courthouse (Virginia), Rustburg, Virginia
Campbell County Courthouse (Wyoming), Sheridan, Wyoming